Debra Louise Searle MVO MBE (born 8 July 1975), née Newbury, later Veal, is a British adventurer, businesswoman, author and keynote speaker. In 2002, Searle rowed across the Atlantic alone after her then husband and rowing partner, Andrew Veal, was rescued from their plywood rowing boat.

Early life and education
Searle was born in Plymouth, Devon, on 8 July 1975 along with her identical twin sister Hayley Barnard. They were adopted by Robin and Christine Newbury as babies and have two older brothers.

Searle attended Stover School, on the edge of Dartmoor, where she first started undertaking expeditions, including Ten Tors and the Duke of Edinburgh's Award. She studied for a BEd and graduated with 1st Class Honours and a number of outdoor instructor qualifications from De Montfort University. She was later awarded an Honorary MA by De Montfort University in 2004 and an Honorary Degree from Plymouth Marjon University in 2019.

Career
Searle taught at St Margaret's School, Exeter, Devon and then at Claremont Fan Court School, Esher, Surrey. She gave up teaching after founding The Well Hung Art Company Ltd in 1999 with two friends, which promoted the work of lesser known artists via the web and sold original fine art to the corporate market.

In 2004, Searle closed The Well Hung Art Company to focus on her second company, Shoal Projects Ltd, which she had founded two years earlier with her twin sister Hayley Barnard. Shoal Projects manages Searle's adventures and other related media, publishing and motivational/leadership development work. From 2002 onwards, Searle has undertaken a number of expeditions and adventurous challenges as detailed below and has worked as a TV presenter, mainly for the BBC. She is much in demand as a motivational speaker and has written and contributed to a number of books and newspapers.

In 2014, Searle and business partner Barnard opened MIX Diversity Developers Ltd, a consultancy firm specialising in Diversity & Inclusion, Unconscious Bias and Cultural Change.  Using evidence in practice combined with the most up-to-date research on diversity and inclusion, MIX are challenging global companies to take a fresh approach to equality in the workplace. Mix was nominated for the HR Supplier Partnership Award by Personnel Today in 2015.

In 2018, Searle founded Brave Girl Media after the story of her Atlantic Row was optioned by an LA based production company.  The movie of Searle's 3.5 month solo journey across the Atlantic is now being developed into a Hollywood movie.

Sport
Always a keen sportswoman, Searle represented her county in tennis and netball and represented the West of England in lacrosse whilst in her teens. She went on to gain a place in the Great Britain Dragon Boat Racing Team in 1998  for the European Championships in Rome and the 1999 World Championships in Nottingham, coming home with gold, silver and bronze medals.

Atlantic Rowing Race
Searle and her then husband Andrew Veal entered the Ward Evans Atlantic Rowing Challenge, a 3,000-mile, double-handed rowing race from Tenerife to Barbados. The challenge included competitors being required to build their own plywood boats from flat pack kits.

There was significant media interest in the couple's entry, as they were the only male/female and husband/wife team out of the 36 teams taking part in the 2001–02 race.

Media interest intensified when Andrew was forced to retire from the race suffering from uncontrollable anxiety. Debra continued on alone, arriving in Barbados after 111 days at sea.  Robert Hall covered the story for the BBC Six O'Clock News over two consecutive days. The Times newspaper ran the story on their front page for three consecutive days. Searle had never rowed before signing up to row across the Atlantic.

Ben Fogle, the adventurer and TV presenter who rowed the Atlantic with James Cracknell in 2005 claimed to have been inspired by Searle's crossing in his book The Crossing, written with James Cracknell.

Searle's story is featured in the multi-award-winning film Row Hard No Excuses by Lantern Films, which was screened on PBS across the US in 2010 and 2011. A dramatisation of the story is in development in Hollywood.

Expeditions and sporting achievements

In 2004, Searle became a member of the Pindar Ocean Racing Team. Yachts and Yachting Magazine reported that Searle was planning an attempt to become the first woman to sail non-stop the 'wrong way' around the world (against the prevailing winds and currents). With major corporate sponsors in place Searle, who had no previous sailing experience, trained to become a RYA Yachtmaster. She competed in a number of major sailing events on board Pindar Open 60 throughout 2005 and sailed on board Pindar in the Global Challenge Southern Ocean leg. However the attempt was scrapped after Searle was beaten to the record by Dee Caffari who set off on 20 November 2005, arriving back in the UK on 18 May 2006, after 178 days at sea.

TV presenting
Searle was approached by the BBC Extreme Lives team with a view to making a documentary about her Atlantic row and subsequent expedition, the Yukon River Quest. Searle invited long-term friend Bruce Parry (who went on to present numerous BBC series including Tribe, Amazon and most recently, Arctic) to partner her in the 742 km canoe race through the Yukon Territory.

As a result of Searle's appearance on Extreme Lives and following an interview for BBC Radio 4's Woman's Hour, she was allocated a talent manager within the BBC and started presenting. She has presented more than forty programmes for the BBC as well as working for ITV, Channel 5 and Sail TV. Credits include Grandstand (BBC1), G2 (BBC2 Grandstand spin-off), Extreme Lives, Builders, Sweat and Tears (BBC1), Big Strong Boys (BBC1) and The Southampton Boat Show (ITV).

The Duke of Edinburgh's Award
In 2003, Searle was invited to be a Trustee of leading youth charity the Duke of Edinburgh's Award. At that time she was the only female and the youngest board member. After a decade on the Board of Trustees, Searle stepped down.

Searle started her own Gold Duke of Edinburgh's Award whilst at school and completed it at university.

Writing

As author
 Rowing it Alone (2002)
 The Journey: How to Achieve Against the Odds (2007)
 The Choose Your Attitude Journal (2019)

As contributor
 Kayak Surfing (2004)
 Extreme Survival (2006)
 My Reason for Hope (2008)
 Numerous articles for British newspapers

Diversity, Equality and Inclusion Advocate
In 2014, Searle and business partner Barnard opened MIX Diversity Developers Ltd, a consultancy firm specialising in Diversity & Inclusion, Unconscious Bias and Cultural Change.

In April 2015 Searle's company led the LeasePlan Women's Arctic Challenge on a ski-trek across Baffin Island in the Arctic Circle. The expedition was part of a wider corporate diversity project designed to challenge stereotypes and provoke conversations around unconscious bias.

Searle, who intended to lead the expedition herself, snapped one of her cruciate ligaments ten days before the expedition and was unable to attend. The team still successfully completed the Challenge and Searle flew out to surprise them at the finish line.

Searle cites that the accolades she received for her Solo Atlantic Row are ultimately a product of gender stereotyping, as ‘her story wouldn’t have even made her local paper had it been her husband who had continued alone and she who had been rescued'. Searle was nominated for the European Inspirational Role Model and Diversity Champion Of The Year Award in 2015, and National Positive Role Model Of The Year Award Nominee by the National Diversity Awards. She has a ‘passion for demolishing stereotypes’ and is a regular speaker on International Women's Day.

Searle was also a founding member of The Business Women's Network Forum, which is based out of Buckingham Palace and chaired by The Countess of Wessex.  She recruited female leaders from major organizations such as HSBC and Google to come together to share best practice on Gender Balance in the Workplace.

Personal life
She married her first husband in 1999 and later divorced him in 2004. She has since remarried and lives in Plymouth with her husband with whom she has had two children.

Searle was appointed Member of the Order of the British Empire in the 2002 Birthday Honours. She was appointed Member of the Royal Victorian Order (MVO) in the 2014 New Year Honours for her work with the Royal Family and The Duke of Edinburgh's Award.

References

External links
 Personal website
 BBC News Coverage of Atlantic Row
 BBC Woman’s Hour interview
 BBC2 Extreme Lives: Yukon River Quest
 Monte Carlo Rally Youtube movie
 Sisterhood Channel Crossing movie
 Telegraph.co.uk blog of Cross Channel
 London Speaker Bureau
 Ocean Rowing
 Row Hard No Excuses Film
 Talisker Whisky Atlantic Challenge
 Speaker Agency Biography and Video

Living people
1975 births
British identical twins
English television presenters
English Christians
English motivational speakers
English female rowers
Sportspeople from Plymouth, Devon
Schoolteachers from Devon
Alumni of De Montfort University
Members of the Order of the British Empire
Members of the Royal Victorian Order
English adoptees